Paul Osbaldiston (born April 27, 1964) is a former punter and placekicker for the Hamilton Tiger-Cats of the Canadian Football League from 1986-2003. He was the Assistant Special Teams/Kicking Coach for the Tiger-Cats until 2014. Osbaldiston was a three-time CFL All-Star, seven-time East Division All-Star and a member of Hamilton’s 1986 and 1999 Grey Cup championship teams.

Early career
Osbaldiston was born in Oldham, Lancashire, England.  He played his rookie season for the British Columbia Lions and the Winnipeg Blue Bombers. He also played for the Richmond Raiders of the British Columbia Football Conference (CJFL) from 1983 to 1985.

Records
CFL
most field goals in a regular season game (8, tied with Dave Ridgeway and Mark McLoghlin)

Hamilton Tiger-Cats
career scoring (2856 points)
single season scoring (233 points)
career converts (652)
single season converts (63)
single game converts (9)
career field goals (655)
single season field goals (54)
single game field goals (8)
career punting yards(88,542)
career punts (2,127)
single season punts (165)

References

1964 births
Living people
BC Lions players
Canadian football punters
Canadian football placekickers
English players of Canadian football
Hamilton Tiger-Cats players
People from Oldham
Winnipeg Blue Bombers players